The Boston and Maine Railroad  was a U.S. Class I railroad in northern New England. Originally chartered in 1835, it became part of what was the Pan Am Railways network in 1983 (most of which was purchased by CSX in 2022).

That year it reported 2,744 million ton-miles of revenue freight and 92 million passenger-miles.

History
The Andover and Wilmington Railroad was incorporated March 15, 1833, to build a branch from the Boston and Lowell Railroad at Wilmington, Massachusetts, north to Andover, Massachusetts. The line opened to Andover on August 8, 1836. The name was changed to the Andover and Haverhill Railroad on April 18, 1837, reflecting plans to build further to Haverhill, Massachusetts (opened later that year), and yet further to Portland, Maine, with renaming to the Boston and Portland Railroad on April 3, 1839, opening to the New Hampshire state line in 1840.

The Boston and Maine Railroad was chartered in New Hampshire on June 27, 1835, and the Maine, New Hampshire and Massachusetts Railroad was incorporated March 12, 1839, in Maine, both companies continuing the proposed line to South Berwick, Maine. The railroad opened in 1840 to Exeter, New Hampshire, and on January 1, 1842, the two companies merged with the Boston and Portland to form a new Boston and Maine Railroad.

On February 23, 1843, the B&M opened to Agamenticus, on the line of the Portland, Saco and Portsmouth Railroad in South Berwick. On January 28 of that year, the B&M and Eastern Railroad came to an agreement to both lease the PS&P as a joint line to Portland.

The Boston and Maine Railroad Extension was incorporated on March 16, 1844, due to a dispute with the Boston and Lowell Railroad over trackage rights rates between Wilmington and Boston. That company was merged into the main B&M on March 19, 1845, and opened on July 1, leading to the abandonment of the old connection to the B&L (later reused by the B&L for its Wildcat Branch). In 1848, another original section was abandoned, as a new alignment was built from Wilmington north to North Andover, Massachusetts in order to better serve Lawrence, Massachusetts.

A new alignment to Portland opened in 1873, splitting from the old route at South Berwick, Maine. The old route was later abandoned. This completed the B&M "main line", which would become known as the Western Route to distinguish it from the Eastern Route (described below), which also connected Boston and Portland.

Acquisitions
As the B&M grew, it also gained control of former rivals, including:

Eastern
On March 28, 1883, the boards of directors of B&M and the Eastern Railroad Company voted to ratify the proposition that Eastern Railroad would be leased by B&M.  However, a disagreement about the wording of the contract delayed its execution until December 2, 1884.  On May 9, 1890, B&M purchased Eastern Railroad outright.  This provided a second route to Maine, ending competition along the immediate route between Boston and Portland. Along with the Eastern, the B&M also acquired many branch lines, including the Conway Branch, the Saugus Branch, the South Reading Branch, and branches to Marblehead and Rockport, Massachusetts.

Worcester, Nashua and Portland

 
The Worcester and Nashua Railroad was organized in 1845 (opened 1848) and the Nashua and Rochester Railroad in 1847, forming a line between Worcester, Massachusetts, and Rochester, New Hampshire, via Nashua. The W&N leased the N&R in 1874, and the two companies merged into the Worcester, Nashua and Rochester Railroad in 1883. The B&M leased the line on January 1, 1886. This acquisition also included the continuation from Rochester to Portland, Maine, incorporated in 1846 as the York and Cumberland Railroad. It opened partially in 1851 and 1853, was reorganized as the Portland and Rochester Railroad in 1867, and opened the rest of the way in 1871. It was again reorganized in 1881 and then operated in conjunction with the line to Worcester.

Boston and Lowell
On April 1, 1887, the B&M leased the Boston and Lowell Railroad, adding not only trackage in the Boston area, but also the Central Massachusetts Railroad west to Northampton, the Boston, Concord and Montreal Railroad into northern New Hampshire, the St. Johnsbury and Lake Champlain Railroad to northwestern Vermont, and the Connecticut and Passumpsic Rivers Railroad from White River Junction into Quebec. However, the BC&M was separated in 1889 and merged with the Concord Railroad to form the Concord and Montreal Railroad, which the B&M leased on April 1, 1895, gaining the Concord Railroad's direct line between Nashua and Concord. Additionally, the St. Johnsbury and Lake Champlain Railroad, owned by the B&M through stock, was leased to the Maine Central Railroad by 1912. The Central Massachusetts Railroad stayed a part of the B&M, as did the Connecticut and Passumpsic Rivers Railroad (as the Passumpsic Division).

Northern
The Northern Railroad was leased to the Boston and Lowell in 1884, but that lease was canceled and the Northern was on its own until 1890, when it was re-leased to the B&L, then part of the B&M. The Northern owned a number of lines running west from Concord.

Connecticut River
On January 1, 1893, the B&M leased the Connecticut River Railroad, with the main line from Springfield, Massachusetts north along the Connecticut River to White River Junction, Vermont, where the Connecticut and Passumpsic Rivers Railroad (acquired in 1887) continued north.  Along with this railroad came the Ashuelot Railroad, which had been acquired in 1877.

Concord and Montreal
The B&M acquired the Boston, Concord and Montreal Railroad in 1887, but gave it up in 1889, allowing it to merge with the Concord Railroad to form the Concord and Montreal Railroad. That company did poorly on its own and was leased by the B&M on April 1, 1895, giving the B&M the majority of lines in New Hampshire.

Fitchburg
The B&M leased the Fitchburg Railroad on July 1, 1900. This was primarily the main line from Boston west via the Hoosac Tunnel to the Albany, New York, area, with various branches. On December 1, 1919, the B&M purchased the Fitchburg Railroad.

At one point, the B&M also owned a majority of stock of the Maine Central Railroad, stretching from Quebec via northern New Hampshire to southern and eastern Maine.

20th century

The B&M flourished with the growth of New England's mill towns in the late 19th and early 20th centuries, but still faced financial struggles. It came under the control of J. P. Morgan and his New York, New Haven and Hartford Railroad around 1910, but anti-trust forces wrested control back. Later, it faced heavy debt problems from track construction and from the cost of acquiring the Fitchburg Railroad, causing a corporate reorganization in 1919.

Beginning in the 1930s, freight business was hurt by the leveling-off of New England manufacturing growth and by new competition from trucking. In 1925, B&M reported 2956 million net ton-miles of revenue freight and 740 million passenger-miles; at the end of the year it operated 2291 route-miles, including "42.85 miles of electric street railway". (Those totals do not include B&C, M&WR, StJ&LC or YH&B.)

The B&M's most traveled and well known passenger trains included the Alouette, Ambassador, Cheshire, Day White Mountains, East Wind, Green Mountain Flyer, Gull, Kennebec, Minute Man, Montrealer/Washingtonian, Mountaineer, Pine Tree, Red Wing, and State of Maine. However, the popularization of the automobile doomed B&M as a passenger carrier.

Passenger service cuts

After steady growth from 1901 to 1913, passenger rail ridership around Boston peaked in 1920 and began to decline due to competition from private automobiles and service cuts during World War I. In the mid-1920s, after several difficult years, the B&M discontinued service on some marginal lines and began using small self-propelled railcars on others. A second round of discontinuances occurred from 1931 to 1936 as the Great Depression reduced traffic. Ridership sharply increased during World War II; the B&M had a slower postwar decline than its contemporaries, though major frequency reductions occurred in 1949–1950. The B&M began testing Budd Rail Diesel Cars (RDCs) in 1952; in 1954, the railroad decided to switch all commuter service to RDCs to cut costs.

Discontinuances in the 1920s and 1930s primarily affected minor branches and rural intercity routes, but the 1950s saw the loss of more significant intercity routes. September, 1952 saw the first cut to the four main intercity mainlines, as Eastern Route service was cut from Portland, Maine to Portsmouth, New Hampshire. (Portland continued to see service to Boston on the Western Route through Dover, New Hampshire.) The New York–Montreal Green Mountain Flyer/Mount Royal, which had Boston sections running on the B&M via Bellows Falls, ended when the Rutland Railroad discontinued all passenger service, in 1953. The northern section of the Boston–Wells River, Vermont route ended in 1954 (thus ending connections to Quebec City), as did Manchester–Portsmouth service. Concord–Claremont Junction service ended in 1955, and the Boston section of the Ambassador was reduced to a Boston–White River Junction RDC connecting train in 1956. Fitchburg mainline service was trimmed from Troy, New York, to Williamstown, Massachusetts, in January 1958, and discontinued soon afterward.

The B&M became unprofitable in 1958 and moved to shed its money-losing passenger operations. On May 18, 1958, the B&M severely reduced Boston commuter service. The Maynard Branch, Saugus Branch, Essex Branch, and Stoneham Branch were cut, and the Central Mass Branch was cut from Clinton to Hudson. Almost all inner-suburb commuter stations within the MTA transit district were closed. Intercity service to Bellows Falls, Vermont and Brattleboro, Vermont (the Cheshire) via the Cheshire Branch was also cut. Further cuts on June 14, 1959, terminated the Swampscott Branch, Marblehead Branch, Danvers Branch, and the north half of the Woburn Loop. The State of Maine Express - the last through service between New York City and Maine - and the Boston–Halifax Gull were discontinued in 1960. Long rural lines to North Conway and Berlin, New Hampshire were cut on December 3, 1961. By 1962, the B&M was preparing ICC applications to discontinue all remaining service.

After the major cuts by the B&M and the New Haven Railroad in the late 1950s, public opinion in Massachusetts began to favor supporting Boston commuter service to prevent it from being cut entirely. From January, 1963 to March, 1964, the state Mass Transportation Commission funded an experiment testing various fares and service levels on the two railroads. On August 3, 1964, the Massachusetts Bay Transportation Authority (MBTA) was formed (as an expansion of the MTA funding district) to subsidize suburban commuter rail operations. Municipalities outside the MBTA district could directly subsidize continued service.

After approval of the applications, the B&M discontinued most interstate service on January 4, 1965. Service via Concord to Laconia, New Hampshire and to Montreal via White River Junction ended, though a single Boston–Concord round trip remained. Western Route service to Portland and Eastern Route service to Portsmouth were discontinued; single Boston–Dover and Boston– round trips were retained. On January 18, 1965, commuter service was cut to the MBTA district and subsidies began.

The Montrealer was discontinued in September, 1966; local service on the Connecticut River Line lasted until the end of that year. The four routes with single daily round-trips slowly ended: South Sudbury on November 26, 1971; Newburyport in April 1976; Haverhill in June 1976; and Bedford on January 10, 1977. (However, Haverhill service was restored by MVRTA subsidy in 1979.) On December 27, 1976, the MBTA bought all B&M commuter equipment, as well as most of the B&M's trackage on Boston's northside (including several abandoned lines). On March 12, 1977, the B&M also won the contract for the southside commuter rail lines that had once been part of the New Haven and B&A: the first time that Boston's commuter rail system had been operated by a single entity. The B&M operated the whole MBTA Commuter Rail system under contract to the MBTA until 1987. The final B&M line to lose passenger service was the Woburn Branch (former Woburn Loop), which was cut on January 30, 1981, due to poor track quality. Under public control, commuter rail service has returned to several lines cut by the B&M, and Portland intercity service returned with the Amtrak Downeaster, in 2001.

Regrowth
The B&M filed for bankruptcy in December 1970. During bankruptcy the B&M reorganized.  It rebuilt its existing fleet of locomotives, leased new locomotives and rolling stock and secured funds for upgrading its track and signal systems.

For much of the 1970s, the Boston and Maine limped along. In 1973 and 1974 the B&M was on the brink of liquidation.  The B&M was offered the opportunity to merge its properties into the new Conrail in 1976,  but opted out. 

By 1980, though still a sick company, the B&M started turning around thanks to aggressive marketing and its purchase of a cluster of branch lines in Connecticut. The addition of coal traffic and piggyback service also helped. In 1983, the B&M emerged from bankruptcy when it was purchased by Timothy Mellon's Guilford Transportation Industries for $24 million. This was the beginning of the end of the Boston & Maine corporate image, and the start of major changes, such as new labor issues which caused the strikes of 1986 and 1987, and drastic cost-cutting such as the 1990 closure of B&M's Mechanicville, New York, site: the largest rail yard and shop facilities on the B&M system.

21st century
 Guilford Rail System changed its name to Pan Am Railways in 2006.  Up until CSX Transportation acquired Pan Am Railways on June 1, 2022, Boston & Maine Corporation continued to exist, but only as a non-operating ward of PAR. Boston & Maine owned the property (and also employed its own railroad police), while Springfield Terminal Railway, a B&M subsidiary created by owner Timothy Mellon to break the unions' higher wage scales, operated the trains and performed maintenance. Pan Am Railways and all its subsidiaries are now owned by CSX.

Pan Am entered a joint venture with Norfolk Southern Railway (NS) in April,  2009 to form Pan Am Southern (PAS). NS transferred cash and other property valued at $140 million to the joint venture, $87.5 million of which was expected to be invested within a three-year period in capital improvements on the Patriot Corridor, such as terminal expansions, track and signal upgrades. Springfield Terminal provides all railroad services for the joint venture.

Service at B&M's former yard in Mechanicville, New York, was restored as an intermodal and automotive terminal in January 2012, under PAS.

Named passenger trains
The B&M operated a number of named passenger trains, which were often the premier intercity service on their routes. Most were through service that were shared between the B&M and other railroads, including the Canadian National Railroad (CN), Canadian Pacific Railway (CP), Central Vermont Railway (CV), Maine Central Railroad (MEC), New York, New Haven and Hartford Railroad (NH), Pennsylvania Railroad (PRR), Quebec Central Railway (QC), and Rutland Railroad (RUT). Trains originating in New York City or Washington, D.C., ran through Springfield (using the Connecticut River Line) or Worcester (using the Worcester Branch) and bypassed Boston. Certain commuter trains with wealthy clientele were also named; several of these lasted into the MBTA era. These tables list major named intercity trains operated by the B&M.

Boston trains

New York/Washington trains via Springfield

New York/Washington trains via Worcester

See also

 Alexander Bonner Latta

Footnotes

References

External links

Boston & Maine Railroad Historical Society
July 1, 1923 Official List - Officers, Agents and Stations
Boston & Maine All-Time Pre-Guilford Diesel Roster
Selected Annual Reports for Boston and Maine, Internet Archive; 1849–1965, years missing

 
Railway companies established in 1963
Predecessors of Pan Am Railways
Connecticut railroads
Maine railroads
New Hampshire railroads
Defunct Massachusetts railroads
Vermont railroads
New York (state) railroads
Former Class I railroads in the United States
Companies based in Boston
Non-operating common carrier freight railroads in the United States
American companies established in 1963